Option citoyenne was an alterglobalization, sovereigntist and feminist political organization in the Canadian province of Quebec.  The group was created by Françoise David in 2004; David and François Saillant were its official spokespersons.  Option citoyenne gave official support to the left-wing Union des forces progressistes, and in 2006 the two groups merged to create Québec solidaire.

References

Organizations based in Quebec
Political advocacy groups in Canada
Feminism in Quebec
Alter-globalization